Terence Willis Austin (born 1 February 1954, in Isleworth) is an English former professional footballer.

He started playing at Crystal Palace for their juniors, but in May 1973 was sold to Ipswich Town. He stayed with Town for three years, before moving to Plymouth Argyle in October 1976. Almost eighteen months later, he was transferred to Walsall in March 1978, and from there, he moved to Mansfield Town, where he had his most productive spell, appearing 84 times, and scoring 31 goals. In December 1980 he moved again to Huddersfield Town where he played for two years. He was sold to Doncaster Rovers in September 1982, and from there, he transferred in August 1983 to Northampton Town where he finished his professional playing career.

He returned to Mansfield once his playing days were over, where he is a financial advisor.

Austin is now semi-retired and spends much of his time at second home in Gran Canaria.

References

External links
Profile on Pride of Anglia website (Requires subscription)

1954 births
Living people
Footballers from Isleworth
English footballers
Association football forwards
Crystal Palace F.C. players
Ipswich Town F.C. players
Plymouth Argyle F.C. players
Walsall F.C. players
Mansfield Town F.C. players
Huddersfield Town A.F.C. players
Doncaster Rovers F.C. players
Northampton Town F.C. players
English Football League players